Maria van Schooten (1555–1573) was a Dutch heroine from the Eighty Years' War. She died from the injuries she received after having participated in the defense during the Siege of Haarlem and was given a public funeral with full military honors.  She is believed to have been one of the women led by Kenau Simonsdochter Hasselaer, a legendary heroine who helped defend Haarlem against the Spanish invaders.

Two centuries after her brief life, van Schooten was included in the Vaderlandsch woordenboek, the national dictionary started by bookseller Jacobus Kok in 1780.

References 
DVN, een project van Huygens ING en OGC (UU). Bronvermelding: Els Kloek, Schooten, Maria van, in: Digitaal Vrouwenlexicon van Nederland. URL: http://resources.huygens.knaw.nl/vrouwenlexicon/lemmata/data/schooten [13/01/2014] 

1555 births
1573 deaths
Dutch people of the Eighty Years' War (United Provinces)
People from Haarlem
16th-century Dutch people
Women in 16th-century warfare
History of Haarlem
Women in war in the Netherlands